Vlatko (Vladimir, Vlado) Kovačević  (born 26 March 1942 in Dubrovnik) is a Croatian and Yugoslavian grandmaster of chess.

In 1970, Vlatko Kovačević tied for 9th-11th in Rovinj–Zagreb (Bobby Fischer won), but beat Fischer in their individual game. In 1975, he tied for 2nd-4th in Rovinj–Zagreb (Gyula Sax won). In 1976, he won in Sombor. In 1976, he tied for 1st-3rd in Virovitica. In 1977, he tied for 1st-3rd in Karlovac. In 1979, he won in Zagreb. In 1979, he won in Virovitica. In 1980, he tied for 2nd-3rd in Virovitica. In 1980, he won in Maribor. In 1981, he won in Tuzla. In 1981, he tied for 2nd-6th in Ramsgate. In 1982, he won in Vinkovci. In 1982/83, he took 2nd in Hastings where (Rafael Vaganian won). In 1986, he tied for 2nd-3rd, behind Jaime Sunye Neto, in Zenica. In 1986, he won in Zagreb.

Kovacevic played in six Chess Olympiads.  They were: for Yugoslavia at Lucerne 1982, Thessaloniki 1984, and Thessaloniki 1988, for Yugoslavia "B" at Novi Sad 1990, for Croatia at Manila 1992 and Elista 1998. He won the individual bronze medal at fourth board in Novi Sad.

FIDE awarded him the International Grandmaster title in 1976.

External links

1942 births
Living people
Chess grandmasters
Chess Olympiad competitors
Croatian chess players
Yugoslav chess players